NCATS may refer to:

 National Center for Advancing Translational Sciences
 NASCAR Canadian Tire Series